Acini di pepe  are a form of pasta. The name is Italian for "seeds of pepper". Acini is the plural of acino whose root is the Latin word acinus. In both Latin and Italian, the word means "grape" or "grape-stones", with the "stones of a grape" being the seeds of the grape. Acini di pepe then translates into "seeds of a pepper". They were and are known as a symbol of fertility, which is why they are used in Italian wedding soup. They are also sometimes referred to as pastina (Italian for "tiny dough"); however, some pasta makers distinguish pastina as smaller than acini di pepe. The individual pieces usually resemble tiny cylinders about 1mm, or less, in each dimension.

Acini di pepe work well in soups and cold salads. Acini di pepe are often used in Italian wedding soup. Frog's eye salad is an American cold salad that combines the pasta with whipped topping, marshmallows, pineapple and mandarin oranges.

References 

Types of pasta